Phước Bình may refer to several places in Vietnam:

, a ward of District 9, Ho Chi Minh City
, a ward of Phước Long
, a rural commune of Trảng Bàng
, a rural commune of Long Thành District
, a rural commune of Bác Ái District
Phước Bình National Park
Former Phước Bình District, Sông Bé Province

See also
Bình Phước Province, in southern Vietnam